The Barracudas de Montpellier are a French baseball team in French Division 1 Baseball Championship based in Montpellier, Hérault. They were founded in 1985. The team plays its home games at Veyrassi Sports Complex on the northern edge of the city of Montpellier.

History 
Under Canadian coach Greg Hamilton, the team won three consecutive French leagues titles from 1993–1995. In 1994, the then 22-year old fellow Canadian pitcher Jeff Zimmerman would spend a season with the Barracudas. Five years later, in 1999, the righthander was selected for the American League All-Star team as 26-year-old rookie for the Texas Rangers. In his '99 season, Zimmerman went 9-3 with a 2.36 ERA for the AL West champs. In his career, the reliever would post a 17–12 record with a 3.27 ERA in 228.2 innings in the majors. Following the departure of Greg Hamilton after the 1997 season, the club had nine different managers from 1998-2008. 

In 2009, Jean Michel Mayeur took over the helm and for three seasons was player/coach before becoming the full-time manager in 2012. In early 2010, local product Anthony Cros would become at the time, just the third French player to sign with a pro club in North America. The power-hitting righty spent 2010 with the Quebec Capitales before returning to the Barracudas the following season. Cros' number 55 is one of five numbers retired by the club to this date. In 2011 and 2015, the Barracudas lost to the Rouen Huskies in the French Series. The club has finished in the top 4 in the 11 team French Division 1 in every year but one since Mayeur became manager. In 2018, Montpellier pitcher Yoan Antonac, who came up through the Montpellier youth teams and academy, was the first player from the club to be signed by an MLB franchise. The tall righty is currently in the Philadelphia Phillies minor league system.

In 2019, the club finished in third place in France with a 23–9 record, thanks in large part to Venezuelan ace Kevin Canelon, who finished 11–1 in 110.2 IP, with 125 K and a 0.49 ERA. The annual Challenge de France was held in Montpellier in 2019, where Senart edged Rouen in a thrilling final by the score of 7-5.  Following the end of the 2019 season, the club said goodbye to former AAA Venezuelan shortstop Larry Infante. Infante, in his two seasons with Montpellier, batted .389 (63-for-162) with 27 runs scored, 1 HR, and 31 RBI in 44 games played.

After a year without baseball due to Covid-19, the 2021 Barracudas won the Challenge de France, qualifying the club for the 2022 CEB Cup, alongside 2021 French champions Rouen. Kevin Canelon, Erly Casanova and Owen Ozanich anchored the pitching staff, which finished with a league best 2.12 ERA. The Barracudas added power hitting infielder Ariel Soriano mid-way through the season. Youngsters Mathis Nayral and Pierre Doat made their division 1 debuts for the club.

In 2022, the Barracudas rotation, led by Kevin Canelon, Owen Ozanich and Mathis Nayral, led the FFBS in team ERA for a second consecutive year, posting a 2.34 team ERA. Offensively, Ariel Soriano led the charge, batting .338 with 1 HR and 18 RBI in 19 games. The team finished the season with a 12-7 overall record, bowing out in the semi-finals to eventual champion Rouen. Ozanich, who posted a 1.92 ERA in two seasons with the club, announced his retirement following the 2022 season.

Eager to bring back a championship to Montpellier, Jean-Michel Mayeur's squad opens the 2023 season at home on Sunday, March 19 against Metz.

European Cup appearances 

 1994 Champions Cup (Amsterdam, Netherlands)
 1995 Champions Cup (Nettuno, Italy)
 1996 CEB Cup (Zagreb, Croatia)
 1997 CEB Cup (Montpellier, France)
 1998 Champions Cup (Karlovac, Croatia)
 2000 Champions Cup (Nettuno, Italy)
 2001 CEB Cup (Montpellier, France)
 2002 Champions Cup (Regensburg, Germany)
 2005 CEB Cup (Montpellier, France)
 2007 Champions Cup (Hoofddorp, Netherlands)
 2011 CEB Cup (Montpellier, France)
 2016 CEB Cup (Rouen, France)

Retired numbers 

 2  James Schwedhelm
 12 Lahcene Benhamida
 42 Laurent Cassier
 55 Anthony Cros
 58 Frederic Raynaud

2023 Schedule 

REGULAR SEASON

March 19--vs Metz (Montpellier, France)

March 26--vs Savigny (Montpellier, France)

April 9--@ Senart (Paris, France)

April 16--vs Nice (Montpellier, France)

April 30--@ Metz (Metz, France)

May 14--@ Savigny (Paris, France)

CHALLENGE DE FRANCE

May 18--vs Montigny (Paris, France) 

May 19--vs Savigny/Toulouse (Paris, France)

REGULAR SEASON

June 4--vs Senart (Montpellier, France)

June 11--vs Metz (Montpellier, France)

July 2--@ Nice (Nice, France)

July 9--vs Senart (Montpellier, France)

July 23--@ Nice (Nice, France)

July 30--@ Savigny (Paris, France)

2022 

Playing without Cuban ace Erly Casanova proved to be more difficult than expected for the 2022 version of the Barracudas. Kevin Canelon, Mathis Nayral and Owen Ozanich anchored the Barracudas pitching staff, which again led the French D1 in ERA despite the absence of Casanova. Infielder Ariel Soriano returned for a second season with the club. Power hitting first baseman Steve Anderson stepped in at first base to bat alongside Soriano in the heart of the lineup. Japanese two-way Kenjiro Sugiura was a useful two-way for Mayeur. 

While Casanova departed, Mayeur's French talent returned in 2022. Two-way player Ismail Pontiac, outfielder Paolo Brossier, catchers Fabien Kovacs and Pierre Doat all produced solid seasons. Mathis Nayral, who made his French national team debut in 2021, emerged as a key arm on the mound. Veterans Clement Le Pichon and Mathis Guiraud also contributed in starting nine. Mael Zan was productive when in the lineup.

Former Phillies minor league pitcher Yoan Antonac came back to France and joined the club. While limited on the mound due to an apparent arm injury, the big righty contributed at first base and at the plate, even launching a home run in June's Confederations Cup against Tenerife. Montpellier bowed out to perennial powerhouse Rouen in the semi-finals. 

Montpellier sent the most players of any club team to the September 2022 World Baseball Classic Qualifiers in Germany. Owen Ozanich, Kenjiro Sugiura, Kevin Canelon, Ariel Soriano, Fabian Kovacs and Paolo Brossier made the trip. Ozanich announced his retirement following the tournament, hanging up the spikes after 12 seasons and 100 wins in Europe, the last two spent in Montpellier.

2021 

After finishing third in the 2019 campaign, the 2020 version of the Barracudas hoped to reach the French Series however they, along with all the other clubs in France were forced to wait, as the 2020 season was cancelled due to Covid-19. 

The club has made some significant additions to the roster. In late 2019, Montpellier announced the signing of pitcher Owen Ozanich. The 32-year-old Ozanich has played in the Australian Baseball League for Adelaide in 2011–2012 and for Parma in the Italian Serie A in 2019–2020 in addition to 8 seasons in Rouen where he went 91–15, winning 7 French championships.  

Canelon (7-3, 1.75 ERA), Cuban righty Erly Casanova (7-1, 2.25 ERA) and Ozanich (4-2, 0.86 ERA) anchored the rotation.

Two Americans, Patrick Cromwell (.280/.430/.404) and Andy Cosgrove (.266/.406/.405) joined the club, Cromwell played infield at Clemson University while Cosgrove arrived after stints at NC State and in the minor leagues (Twins organization).

Nine Barracudas returned from US college seasons. Fabien Kovacs, Mael Zan, Julien Monks, Luc Polit, Nolan Soliveres, Nicolas Khoury, Ismail Pontiac, Fred Walter and Paolo Brossier all played in the states in early 2021 and came back in the south of France to solidify manager Jean Michel Mayeur's team. 

The Barracudas finished the regular season 17-3, second in their pool behind Senart.

In September 2021 Montpellier went 4-0 in the annual Challenge de France, taking home the club's first title since 2006. Montpellier's pitching staff led the tournament in ERA and strikeouts. Mathis Nayral, Owen Ozanich, Erly Casanova and Kevin Canelon each won a game. Canelon took home tournament MVP honors. Paolo Brossier, Ariel Soriano and Clement Le Pichon homered in a 15-1 win over Rouen in the final. The Barracudas earned a spot in the 2022 CEB European Cup.

The defending French champions, Rouen Huskies, knocked the 2021 Barracudas out of the playoffs in the semi-finals; taking the best-of-five series three games to one.

Current roster 

PITCHERS

Kevin Canelon (VENEZUELA)

Daniel Gosselin (GREECE/USA)

Mathis Nayral 

Ismail Pontiac

Ben Courvreur

Valentin Blanc Jouvan

Quentin Lesfargues

CATCHERS

Fabian Kovacs 

Theo Garcia

Lucio Keurinck

INFIELDERS

Steve Anderson (USA)

Ismail Pontiac

Yoan Antonac

Mathis Guiraud

Oscar Bustamonte (USA)

Mathis Nayral

Pierre Doat

Dorian Bouniol

Julien Monks

OUTFIELDERS

Paolo Brossier

Clement Le Pichon

Nicolas Khoury

Eloi Baisse Depontieu

Arthur Bidaut

Mael Zan

External link

Official site

Division Élite teams